Buddies may refer to:
 Friendship, a relationship between two people who hold mutual affection for each other
 Buddies (TV series), the name of a short-lived sitcom starring Dave Chappelle that aired on ABC in 1996
 Buddies (1976 film), a 1976 Swedish film
 Buddies (1985 film), a 1985 American film
 Buddies (1983 film), a 1983 Australian film
 Buddies (2012 film), a 2012 Brazilian film
 The Buddies, an American doo wop group from the mid-20th century
 Buddies (EP), a 2010 EP by Frank Turner and Jon Snodgrass
 Buddies (play), a 1919 Broadway musical by George V. Hobart with music by Bentley Collingwood Hilliam
 Buddies (album), a 2003 compilation album by Lead, FLAME and w-inds
 Turtles, reptiles of the order Testundines, of which some species make for great animal companions.

See also 
 Buddy (disambiguation)